The 2013 Lega Nord leadership election took place in November–December 2013.

Background and race
In September 2013 Roberto Maroni, who had been secretary of the party for just about a year, announced he would soon step down from the party's leadership.

A federal congress was scheduled for mid December and five candidates filed their bid to become secretary: Umberto Bossi (the party's founder and former leader), Matteo Salvini, Giacomo Stucchi, Manes Bernardini and Roberto Stefanazzi. Of these, only Bossi and Salvini gathered the 1,000 necessary signatures by party members to take part to a closed "primary" (open only to a selected public of party members), and Salvini collected four times the signatures gathered by Bossi.

On 7 December Salvini trounced Bossi with 82% of the vote in the "primary". His election was ratified by the party's federal congress on 15 December.

Main candidates

First round

Source: La Stampa

Primary election

Turnout: 60.0%
Source: Adnkronos

Results by Regions

References

2013 elections in Italy
Political party leadership elections in Italy
November 2013 events in Italy
December 2013 events in Italy
Lega Nord leadership election